Speed skydiving is a skydiving competition in which the goal is to achieve and maintain the highest possible terminal velocity. It was developed in the late 1990s and is the fastest non-motorized sport on Earth. The speed, achieved by the human body in free fall, is a function of several factors; including the body's mass, orientation, and skin area and texture. In stable, belly-to-earth position, terminal velocity is about 200 km/h (120 mph). Stable freefall head down position has a terminal speed of 240–290 km/h (around 150–180 mph). Further minimization of drag by streamlining the body allows for speeds over 500 km/h (310 mph).

Competition

Speed Skydiving is a competition discipline within the sport of Skydiving. The competition objective is for the competitors to fly their body as fast as possible to achieve the highest average vertical speed through a 3 second window.

The speed is measured using a Speed Measuring Device (SMD) worn on the competitor’s helmet. The current technology used to measure the speed is GPS technology using the FlySight device (https://www.flysight.ca/). Previously (see below) barometric measuring devices were  used.

The competitors exit from the competition aircraft between 13,000ft and 14,000ft (3,962m to 4,267m). Each competitor then turns 90° from the direction in which the aircraft is travelling, alternately left and right. The competitors then accelerate by flying head-first towards the earth, only slowing down once they have passed the 7,400ft competition window from their exit altitude. The score is the average vertical speed in km/h of the fastest 3 second which the competitor achieves within the competition window.

Speeding Skydiving is now one of the disciplines governed by the International Skydiving Commission (https://fai.org/commission/isc), a commission of the FAI (https://fai.org/). Before being adopted by the ISC, Speed Skydiving was governed by International Speed Skydiving Association (https://www.speed-skydiving.com/), who developed initial rules and continues to conduct competitions. The ISSA maintains eternal ranking lists for the current GPS measured events (https://www.speed-skydiving.com/index.php/rankings/eternal-ranking-gps) and one performances measured using barometric SMDs (https://www.speed-skydiving.com/index.php/rankings/eternal-ranking-barometric).

Records 
The current world record for the fastest competitor using the GPS measuring system is Marco Hepp from Germany. He flew 529.77 km/h in the competition window at the 4th FAI World Speed Skydiving Championships in October 2022. The fastest female competitor is Natisha Dingle of Australia who flew 491.99 km/h in the competition window at the same competition.

History 
The first competition organized in the USA in Deland Florida was in 1998 with the barometric Protrack built by Larsen & Brusgaard (https://www.lbaltimeters.com/). The first speed skydiving competition in Europe was organized in September 1999 at the drop zone Gap-Tallard (France) and was won by Mike Brooke. The first international world cup was organized in 2000 by the ISST (International Speed Skydiving Tribe) lead by Mike Brooke who pushed the sport forwards with use of two measuring devices. The devices were set on each side of the parachute of each participant instead of the foot to take away effects of dynamic air pressure on the results.  An International speed skydiving world cup was run in Deland (Florida), Lincolnshire, UK, Botten, Switzerland, Lapalisse (France), Empuriabrava (Spain), Texel (Holland).

Terminal Velocity

The terminal velocity of a falling body occurs during free fall when the force due to gravity is exactly balanced by the force due to air resistance, such that the body experiences zero acceleration. The formula for terminal velocity (where buoyancy in air is negligible) is given by the thrust
 

where

 is the mass of the falling object
 is the acceleration due to gravity (9.8 m/s2)
 is the drag coefficient (~0.7 for head down position, ~1 for belly-to-earth position)
 is the density of the fluid through which the object is falling (1.23 kg/m3 for air at sea level, and ~0.99 kg/m3 at the middle of the measurement zone (2200m))
 is the projected area of the object, or area cross-section (~0.18 m2 for head down position, ~0.7 for belly-to-earth position)

So, for a human in belly-to-earth position ( m2,  kg) this gives 50.6 m/s, about the terminal velocity of the typical skydiver of 55 m/s.

The skydiver cannot increase their mass easily enough to significantly increase terminal velocity, and the skydiver's area cross-section is limited by their helmet and shoulders in a head-down dive position. The most significant difference comes from the skydiver reducing their coefficient of friction. The head-down body position has to be carefully managed to be as streamlined as possible, while special helmets and slick body suits reduce skin friction, which is a function of surface area and texture. The shape and rigidity of the suits also have to be designed to minimize the coefficient of drag. Finally, a skydiver must reach their maximum speed at as high an altitude as possible so that the density of air is at a minimum.

Weather
Weather can have an extraordinary effect on a competition as well as individual divers.  In the event of bad weather or air traffic circumstances, the exit altitude is lowered.  In addition, thick cloud conditions may cause a delay in the jump time altogether.

See also
 Red Bull Stratos

Notes

Parachuting